This article contains the list of candidates associated with the 2016 Republican Party presidential primaries for the 2016 United States presidential election.

Candidates 
Individuals included in this section have their own Wikipedia page and either formally announced their candidacy or filed as a candidate with Federal Election Commission (FEC) (for other than exploratory purposes).

Nominee

Withdrew during the primaries 
The following individuals participated in at least two presidential debates. They withdrew or suspended their campaigns at some point after the Iowa caucuses on February 1, 2016. They are listed in order of exit, starting with the most recent.

Withdrew before the primaries 
The following individuals participated in at least one authorized presidential debate but withdrew from the race before the Iowa caucuses on February 1, 2016. They are listed in order of exit, starting with the most recent.

Other candidates 

The following notable individuals filed as candidates with FEC by November 2015.

Additionally, Peter Messina was on the ballot in Louisiana, New Hampshire, and Idaho. Tim Cook was on the ballot in Louisiana, New Hampshire and Arizona. Walter Iwachiw was on the ballot in Florida and New Hampshire.

Other withdrawn candidates 
Individuals in this section formally announced a bid for the nomination of the Republican Party, and filed with the FEC to be a candidate, but were not featured in any major opinion polls, and were not invited to any televised presidential primary debates.

Potential candidates who did not run

Previous 
The following people were the focus of presidential speculation in multiple media reports during the 2016 election cycle but did not enter the race.

Declined 
Individuals listed in this section were the focus of media speculation as being possible 2016 presidential candidates but publicly, and unequivocally, ruled out presidential bids in 2016.

See also 
 2016 United States presidential election timeline

Candidates
 Democratic Party presidential candidates, 2016
 United States third party and independent presidential candidates, 2016

Primaries
 Democratic Party presidential primaries, 2016
 Republican Party presidential primaries, 2016

General election polling
 Nationwide opinion polling for the United States presidential election, 2016
 Statewide opinion polling for the United States presidential election, 2016

Democratic primary polling
 Statewide opinion polling for the Democratic Party presidential primaries, 2016
 Nationwide opinion polling for the Democratic Party 2016 presidential primaries

Republican primary polling
 Statewide opinion polling for the Republican Party presidential primaries, 2016
 Nationwide opinion polling for the Republican Party 2016 presidential primaries

Republican primary debates
 Republican Party presidential debates, 2016

Democratic primary debates
 Democratic Party presidential debates, 2016

Notes

References

External links 
 
 2016 Presidential Form 2 Filers at the Federal Election Commission (FEC)

Presidential candidates, 2016